Simon Aspelin and Julian Knowle were the defending champions, but lost in the first round to Tomáš Berdych and Radek Štěpánek.

Mikhail Youzhny and Mischa Zverev won in the final 3–6, 6–4, [10–3], against Lukáš Dlouhý and Leander Paes.

Seeds

Draw

Draw

External links
Doubles draw

Doubles